Veera Ballala I succeeded Ereyanga as king of the Hoysala Empire. He was a Jain by faith. His rule was short and uneventful other than subduing the Chengalvas and the Santharas. He made some unsuccessful attempts to overthrow the overlordship of the Western Chalukyas but was brought under control by Chalukya Vikramaditya VI.

According to Sen, his rule was from 1100–1110 with the capital at Belur.  An alternate capital was at Halebidu.

References

Sources
 Dr. Suryanath U. Kamat, A Concise history of Karnataka from pre-historic times to the present, Jupiter books, MCC, Bangalore, 2001 (Reprinted 2002) OCLC: 7796041

Hoysala kings
12th-century Indian Jains
12th-century Indian monarchs
Jain monarchs
Year of birth unknown